Rousas John Rushdoony (April 25, 1916 – February 8, 2001) was an American Calvinist philosopher, historian, and theologian. He is credited as being the father of Christian Reconstructionism and an inspiration for the modern Christian homeschool movement.  His followers and critics have argued that his thought exerts considerable influence on the evangelical Christian right.

Biography 
Rousas John Rushdoony was born in New York City, the son of recently arrived Armenian immigrants, Vartanoush (née Gazarian) and Yegheazar Khachig Rushdoony. Before his parents fled the Armenian genocide of 1915, his ancestors had lived in a remote area near Mount Ararat. It is said that since the year 320 AD, every generation of the Rushdoony family has produced a Christian priest or minister. Rushdoony himself claimed that his ancestors "would perpetually give a member of their family to be a priest to perform a kind of Aaronic priesthood as in the Old Testament, an hereditary priesthood. Whoever in the family felt called would become the priest. And our family did so. So from the early 300's until now there has always been someone in the ministry in the family."

Within weeks of arriving in America, his parents moved to the small farming community of Kingsburg, California, in Fresno County, where a number of other Armenian families had relocated. There his father Yegheazar founded a church, Armenian Martyrs Presbyterian. Rousas learned to read English by poring over the family's King James Bible: "By the time I reached my teens I had read the Bible through from cover to cover, over and over and over again".

The family moved in 1925 for a short time to Detroit, where his father pastored another Armenian church. They returned to Kingsburg in 1931 and Rousas completed school in California. His father was pastor of Bethel Armenian Presbyterian Church in San Francisco in 1942.  Rousas had a younger sister, Rose (named for their mother), and brother, Haig. His father died in Fresno in 1961.

Education 
Rushdoony attended public schools where he learned English, though Armenian was the language spoken at home. He continued his education at the University of California, Berkeley, where he earned a B.A. in English in 1938, a teaching credential in 1939 and an M.A. in Education in 1940. Rushdoony and Arda Gent married in San Francisco the week before Christmas, 1943.

Rushdoony attended the Pacific School of Religion, a Congregational and Methodist seminary in Berkeley, California, from which he graduated in 1944. Through letters over the years he kept up his friendship with his Pacific School of Religion mentor, theology professor George Huntston Williams, who saw in him the "heir of a great national Christian heritage" who would "enunciate anew the Gospel which seems to have been forgotten for a season." In 1944 he was ordained by the Presbyterian Church in the United States of America.

He was later awarded an honorary Ph.D. from Valley Christian University for his book, The Philosophy of the Christian Curriculum. Gary North stated that Rushdoony read at least one book a day, six days a week, for fifty years of his life, underlining sentences and making an index of its main ideas in the rear.

Ministry 
Rushdoony and his wife Arda served for eight and a half years as missionaries to the Shoshone and Paiute Indians on the remote Duck Valley Indian Reservation in northern Nevada. They lived in the reservation's primary town, Owyhee. It was during their mission to the Native Americans that Rushdoony began writing.

Arda taught at the reservation school and at Sunday school, led a Girl Scout troop, coached the girls' basketball team, and visited with families. In 1945 they adopted Ronald, an orphaned baby from the reservation. Between 1947 and 1952 in Owyhee, four daughters were born to them. In late 1952 Rushdoony took an American Presbyterian Church pastorate at Trinity Presbyterian Church in Santa Cruz, California and the family left Duck Valley in January 1953. Their son Mark was born the next month in Santa Cruz.

In Santa Cruz, Rushdoony became a reader of the Christian libertarian magazine Faith and Freedom, which advocated an "anti-tax, non-interventionist, anti-statist economic model" in opposition to Franklin D. Roosevelt's New Deal. Faith and Freedoms views on government aligned with Rushdoony's fears of centralized government power, given the Rushdoony family's memories of the Armenian Genocide. Rushdoony contributed articles to Faith and Freedom, including one describing his observations of the Duck Valley Indian Reservation, arguing that government support had reduced residents to "social and personal irresponsibility".

The Rushdoonys separated in 1957 and later divorced. About this time, Rushdoony transferred his church membership from the American Presbyterian Church to the Orthodox Presbyterian denomination. The Orthodox Presbyterian Church's newsletter, The Presbyterian Guardian, reported in July 1958 that "the Rev. Rousas J. Rushdoony… was received and a new Orthodox Presbyterian Church organized, consisting of [sixty-six charter members] who had separated from the Presbyterian Church in the U.S.A. in Santa Cruz."  In their petition the group asked that Rushdoony be ordained as their pastor and stated, "[W]e cannot abide in any church which seeks to define righteousness or sin, salvation or sanctification, except in terms of the Word of God. We have witnessed, here in Santa Cruz, against modernism, man-made perfectionism, and church bureaucracy". The newsletter article goes on to report, "The Presbytery in receiving the church also examined Mr. Thomas Kirkwood and Mr. Kenneth Webb as prospective elders, and they with Mr. Rushdoony were constituted the session of the church," and announced the publication of Rushdoony's By What Standard? later that year.

Later life 
The May 1962 edition of The Presbyterian Guardian reported Rushdoony's resignation, noted as "reportedly to devote his time for his writing and lecturing." Rushdoony also married his second wife, Dorothy Barbara Ross Kirkwood, in 1962. She died in 2003.

Rushdoony moved to Los Angeles in 1965 and founded the Chalcedon Foundation; the monthly Chalcedon Report, which Rushdoony edited, began appearing that October. His daughter Sharon later married Gary North, a Christian Reconstructionist writer and economic historian. North and Rushdoony became collaborators and their partnership lasted until 1981 when it was ended due to a dispute over the content of one of North's articles. Following the dispute, North and Chalcedon continued to independently promote each other's views, but they did not reach a "truce" until 1995.

Under Rushdoony, the Chalcedon Foundation grew to twelve staff members with 25,000–40,000 people on their mailing lists during the 1980s. Chalcedon and Reconstructionism obtained the support of major Christian book publishers and endorsements from influential evangelical leaders including Pat Robertson, Jerry Falwell and Frank Schaeffer (who later repudiated the movement).

RJ Rushdoony died in 2001 with his children at his side. Rushdoony's son, the Rev. Mark R Rushdoony, became and remains the president of the Chalcedon Foundation and editor of the Chalcedon Report.

Philosophical and theological contributions 
Michael J. McVicar summarized Rushdoony's theology and philosophy as follows:

Rushdoony developed his philosophy as an extension of the work of Calvinist philosopher Cornelius Van Til. Van Til critiqued human knowledge in light of the Calvinist doctrine of total depravity. He argued that sin affected a person's ability to reason. In order to be rational, Van Til claimed, one must presuppose the existence of God and the inerrant, divine inspiration of the (Protestant) Bible. Rushdoony attended to the implications – where Van Til held true knowledge came from God, Rushdoony asserted that "all non-Christian knowledge is sinful, invalid nonsense. The only valid knowledge that non-Christians possess is 'stolen' from 'Christian-theistic' sources." In effect, Rushdoony extended Van Til's thinking from philosophy to "all of life and thought."

Early writings 
Rushdoony began to promote the works of Calvinist philosophers Cornelius Van Til and Herman Dooyeweerd into a short survey of contemporary humanism called By What Standard?. Arguing for a Calvinist system of thought, Rushdoony dealt with subjects as broad as epistemology and cognitive metaphysics and as narrow as the psychology of religion and predestination. He wrote a book, The One And The Many: Studies in the Philosophy of Order and Ultimacy, using Van Tillian presuppositional philosophy to critique various aspects of secular humanism. He also wrote many essays and book reviews, published in such venues as the Westminster Theological Journal.

Homeschooling 
Rushdoony's next focus was on education, especially on behalf of homeschooling, which he saw as a way to combat the intentionally secular nature of the U.S. public school system. By the early 1960s, he was active in the homeschooling movement, appearing as an expert witness in order to defend the rights of homeschoolers. He vigorously attacked progressive school reformers such as Horace Mann and John Dewey and argued for the dismantling of the state's influence on education in three works: Intellectual Schizophrenia (a general and concise study of education), The Messianic Character of American Education (a history and castigation of public education in the U.S.), and The Philosophy of the Christian Curriculum (a parent-oriented pedagogical statement).

History 
Rushdoony then pursued history – of the world, of the United States, and of the church. He maintained that Calvinistic Christianity provided the intellectual roots for the American Revolution and thus had always had an influential impact in American history. The American Revolution, according to Rushdoony, was a "conservative counterrevolution" to preserve American liberties from British usurpation and it owed nothing to the Enlightenment.  He further argued that the United States Constitution was a secular document in appearance only and did not need to establish Christianity as an official religion since the states were already Christian establishments. Drawing on the work of theologian Robert Lewis Dabney, Rushdoony argued that the American Civil War "destroyed the early American Republic, which he envisioned as a decentralized Protestant feudal system and an orthodox Christian nation." Rushdoony
saw the North's victory as a "defeat for Christian orthodoxy."
Some historians have argued that this aspect of Rushdoony's thought influenced some activists in the
Neo-Confederate movement and Southern conservatives such as J. Steven Wilkins. He would further this study in his works on American ideology and historiography, This Independent Republic: Studies in the Nature and Meaning of American History and The Nature of the American System.

On the matter of Israel's place in history, he believed that the prophet Daniel "makes clear that God by-passed His chosen people in favor of four great monarchies...and then called forth a Fifth Monarchy which is by no means identified with Israel".

Christian Reconstruction 

Rushdoony's most important area of writing, however, was law and politics, as expressed in his small book of popular essays Law & Liberty and discussed in much greater detail in his three-volume, 1,894-page magnum opus, The Institutes of Biblical Law. With a title modeled after Calvin's Institutes of the Christian Religion, Rushdoony's Institutes was arguably his most influential work. In the book, he proposed that Old Testament law should be applied to modern society and that there should be a Christian theonomy, a concept developed in his colleague Greg Bahnsen's controversial book Theonomy in Christian Ethics, which Rushdoony heartily endorsed. In the Institutes, Rushdoony supported the reinstatement of the Mosaic law's penal sanctions. Under such a system, the list of civil crimes which carried a death sentence would include homosexuality, adultery, incest, lying about one's virginity, bestiality, witchcraft, idolatry or apostasy, public blasphemy, false prophesying, kidnapping, rape, and bearing false witness in a capital case. Although he supported the separation of church and state at the national level, Rushdoony also believed that both institutions were under the rule of God, and thus he conceived secularism as posing endless false dichotomies, which his massive work addresses in considerable detail. In short, he sought to cast a vision for the reconstruction of society based on Christian principles. The book was critical of democracy. He wrote that "the heresy of democracy has since then worked havoc in church and state ... Christianity and democracy are inevitably enemies" because democracy asserts the will of man over the will of God.

Rushdoony believed that a republic is a better form of civil government than a democracy.  According to Rushdoony, a republic avoided mob rule and the rule of the "51%" of society; in other words "might does not make right" in a republic. Rushdoony wrote that America's separation of powers between 3 branches of government is a far more neutral and better method of civil government than a direct democracy, stating "[t]he [American] Constitution was designed to perpetuate a Christian order".  Rushdoony argues that the Constitution's purpose was to protect religion from the federal government and to preserve "states' rights."

Rushdoony's work has been used by Dominion Theology advocates who attempt to implement a Christian government subject to Biblical law in the United States. Authority, behavioral boundaries, economics, penology and the like would all be governed by biblical principles in Rushdoony's vision, but he also proposed a wide system of freedom, especially in the economic sphere, and claimed Ludwig von Mises as an intellectual mentor; he called himself a Christian libertarian.

Rushdoony was the founder in 1965 of the Chalcedon Foundation and the editor of its monthly magazine, the Chalcedon Report. He also published the Journal of Christian Reconstruction and was an early board member of the Rutherford Institute, founded in 1982 by John W. Whitehead.

In 1972, Cornelius Van Til "disclaimed affiliation" with Rushdoony and the Christian Reconstructionist movement, writing "...I am frankly a little concerned about the political views of Mr. Rushdoony and Mr. North and particularly if I am correctly informed about some of the views Gary North has with respect to the application of Old Testament principles to our day. My only point is that I would hope and expect they would not claim such views are inherent in the principles I hold".

Criticism 
Rushdoony was, and remains, a controversial figure, as is the Christian Reconstructionist movement in which he was involved.  Pointing to Rushdoony's support for the death penalty, the British Centre for Science Education decried his perceived dislike of democracy and tolerance. Furthermore, Rushdoony has been accused of Holocaust denial and racism.

According to Frank Schaeffer, Rushdoony believed that interracial marriage, which he referred to as "unequal yoking", should be made illegal; however, his son Mark R. Rushdoony stated that his father R. J. Rushdoony officiated at weddings between European American and African American couples, teaching that "I cannot forbid what God has not!" What R. J. Rushdoony actually thought was imprudent, according to his son Mark R. Rushdoony, were marriages in which there were significant cultural differences such as those between non-Christian war brides from Japan and American soldiers who, in Rushdoony's view, little understood one another; in his own life, the father of the first woman whom R. J. Rushdoony courted rejected Rushdoony's proposal citing cultural differences between their Swedish background and Rushdoony's Armenian background. Mark R. Rushdoony stated that R. J. Rushdoony's views "did not reflect on any race but on what could potentially create an unequal yoke" and asserted his own father's view that "Man ... cannot treat his fellow-men or any part of creation with contempt."

He also opposed "enforced integration", referred to Southern slavery as "benevolent", and said that "some people are by nature slaves". Kerwin Lee Klein, however, argues that Rushdoony was not a "biological racialist" and that for him "racism founded on modern biology simply represented another pagan revival."

In The Institutes of Biblical Law, he uses the 1967 work Judaism and the Vatican by Léon de Poncins as a source for Paul Rassinier's figure of 1.2 million Jewish deaths during the Holocaust, and the claim that Raul Hilberg calculated the number at 896,292, and further asserts that very many of these died of epidemics. He called the charge of 6 million Jewish deaths "false witness" against Germany. In 2000, Rushdoony stated concerning this passage in his Institutes: "It was not my purpose to enter a debate over numbers, whether millions were killed, or tens of millions, an area which must be left to others with expertise in such matters. My point then and now is that in all such matters what the Ninth Commandment requires is the truth, not exaggeration, irrespective of the cause one seeks to serve." Carl R. Trueman, Professor of Historical Theology and Church History at Westminster Theological Seminary wrote in 2009 regarding the passage and Rushdoony's Holocaust denial:

Joe Boot, on the other hand, rejects Trueman's claim, arguing that Rushdoony's "sole point was to say that our society has become so desensitized to violence, brutality, and cruelty that citing murders in small numbers doesn't have the same psychological impact upon people anymore."

Murray Rothbard, a prominent figure in the American libertarian movement, disputed Rushdoony's claim of being a libertarian in a scathing book review of Rushdoony's Intellectual Schizophrenia.

Selected works

References

Further reading 
  Originally appeared as

External links 

 The Chalcedon Foundation
 "The Vision of R. J. Rushdoony" – a biography by Rushdoony's son
 
 
 
 
 
 Works at LibraryThing
 Articles of Rushdoony in "Résister et construire" 
 West Virginia Division of Culture and History. Marriage License: Thomas Gilbert Kirkwood & Dorothy Barbara Ross. August 1, 1932.
 Find a Grave. Dorothy Barbara Ross Rushdoony.
 

1916 births
2001 deaths
20th-century Calvinist and Reformed theologians
American Calvinist and Reformed theologians
American evangelicals
American libertarians
American people of Armenian descent
American Presbyterians
Philosophers from New York (state)
American Christian creationists
Christian libertarians
Christian reconstructionism
Dominion theology
Armenian Protestants
Advocates of unschooling and homeschooling
Homeschooling advocates
John Birch Society members
Orthodox Presbyterian Church ministers
Pacific School of Religion alumni
Writers from New York City
Politics and race in the United States
Calvinist and Reformed philosophers
University of California, Berkeley alumni
People from Kingsburg, California
20th-century American clergy
Conservatism in the United States
People from Elko County, Nevada